The Aloha Festivals are an annual series of free cultural celebrations observed in the state of Hawaii in the United States. It is the only statewide cultural festival in the nation. Highlights include the presentation of the Royal Court, a ho'olaule'a in Waikiki, and the Floral Parade. Approximately 30,000 people volunteer to plan, organize, and provide labor for the Aloha Festivals each year. Their efforts entertain over 1,000,000 people from throughout the state and visitors from all over the world.

History

Establishment 
In the spirit of preserving the Hawaiian culture and heritage, the Aloha Festivals were established in 1946 as Aloha Week by former members of the local Junior Chamber of Commerce. The former manager of the festivals, Goriann Akau, has said, "In 1946, after the war, Hawaiians needed an identity. We were lost and needed to regroup. When we started to celebrate our culture, we began to feel proud. We have a wonderful culture that had been buried for a number of years. This brought it out again. Self-esteem is more important than making a lot of money."

Scaling down 
The festival was celebrated on six of Hawaii's islands, but in 2008 festival organizers decided to hold most events on Oahu due to a lack of funding. There was also the chance that the Floral Parade would be cancelled altogether, but it was saved by private donors and funds from the City and County of Honolulu.

No Aloha festival was held in 2020.

Events

Presentation of the Royal Court 
The court is selected from a pool of applicants, all of whom must be of Hawaiian ancestry and of certain ages. The festival itself begins with the presentation of the royal court during the opening ceremony. The ceremony takes place at Helumoa, a section of Waikiki near the Royal Hawaiian Center.

Floral Parade 
The Floral Parade starts at the intersection of Ala Moana Boulevard and Kamakee st. and goes through Waikiki before finishing at Kapiolani Park. The parade features p'au riders, marching bands, hula halaus, and that year's Aloha Festival Royal Court.

Hoʻolauleʻa
The Hoʻolauleʻa is a block party held in Waikiki. There is Hawaiian music, hula, and food. Attendance is typically in the thousands.

Themes 
Each year has a specific theme:

 2019:  Nā Mo'olelo ʻUkulele: 'Ukulele Stories.
 2018: No Ke Kai Kakou E ("We are of the Sea")
2016: Hāli‘a Aloha ("Treasured memories")
2015: Hula Aloha ("Beloved Feather Treasures")
2010-14: ? (info needed for these years)
2009: Hula ("Let the Story Be Told")
2008: Hula ("The Art of Hawaiian Dance")
2005: Nā Honu Hawaii  ("The Spirit Within")
2004: No Nā Kamalii  ("For the Children")
2003: E Mau Ana Ka Hula I Ke Kanaka ("Hula Lives Through Its People")
2002: Ka Uhane O Ka Loea ("The Spirit of the Masters")
2001: Hoohanohano I Nā Holokai ("Honor the Voyagers")
2000: He Makana O Nā Lei Nani ("A Gift of Beautiful Leis")
1999: Hui Pū I ka Hula ("Together in Song and Dance")
1998: Ola Ka Ōiwi ("The Natives Endure")

References

External links
 http://www.alohafestivals.com

Celebrations in Hawaii
Festivals in Hawaii
Polynesian festivals
Cultural festivals in Oceania
Native Hawaiian culture
1946 establishments in Hawaii
Music festivals established in 1946
Folk festivals in the United States
Flower festivals in the United States